Lise Bourdin (born 20 November 1925) is a French retired film actress. 

As of 2017, Bourdin resided in Paris.

Selected filmography
 Children of Love (1953)
 The River Girl (1954)
 The Last Five Minutes (1955)
 Desperate Farewell (1955)
 La ladra (1955)
 Love in the Afternoon (1957)
 The River of Three Junks (1957)
 Ces dames préfèrent le mambo (1957)
 The Last Blitzkrieg (1959)

References

Bibliography
 Goble, Alan. The Complete Index to Literary Sources in Film. Walter de Gruyter, 1999.

External links
 

1925 births
Living people
French film actresses
People from Allier